Mme. d'Esperance (born Elizabeth Jane Puttock, 20 November 1848 – 20 July 1919) was an English spiritualist medium who was exposed as a fraud.

Biography 

Elizabeth was born the daughter of George Puttock, a sailor, and his wife Elizabeth Jane Tovey. Growing up in London, Elizabeth claimed to have lived in a haunted mansion with many empty rooms that she liked to explore. She spent a rather lonely childhood full of alleged psychic visions, her mother’s verbal and physical abuse, and harassment by doctors. Elizabeth discovered spiritualism in the early 1870s in the form of mediumistic powers including automatic writing, ectoplasm, premonitions and table-turning. Elizabeth married a Mr. Reed and resided in Newcastle when she adopted the pseudonym "Mme. d'Esperance". Under that name, she began travelling through Europe, giving séances in Denmark, France, Norway, Belgium, Sweden and Germany. She gained notoriety for performances in which she seemed to materialize flowers and spirits in the séance room. This led to much controversy at the time. 

She wrote two books on spiritualism. Her first book describes her experiences from childhood, living in a "haunted mansion" with her sick mother while her father was away at sea. She describes the shadows she saw in the house, called "Shadow People". The book describes how she developed her psychic abilities, the experiments she performed with psychical researchers and her circle.  
      
Her last mediumistic séance was held on 1 May 1919 in (Østerbro) Copenhagen, Denmark. She died shortly after that, on 20 July 1919.

Fraud 
In 1880 in a séance a spirit named "Yohlande" materialized, a sitter grabbed it and was revealed to be Elizabeth herself. Regarding the exposure M. Lamar Keene wrote in his book The Psychic Mafia "Madame D’Esperance, was exposed-- literally. Ectoplasm grabbed in the dark by a sitter turned out to be the medium in total dishabille. After that embarrassing interlude, Madame D’Esperance apparently became more careful since she wasn’t busted again for thirteen years."

In a séance in Helsinki, Finland, December 11, 1893 Elizabeth claimed to have dematerialized the lower part of her body whilst only her head and stomach remained. Alexandr Aksakov wrote a booklet A Case of Partial Dematerialization which supported Elizabeth's claims of dematerialization (1898). Psychical researcher Hereward Carrington noted that the room was so dark that trickery would have been easy to perform. Carrington suggested how she had performed the trick:

"The back of the chair was partially open, and of sufficient size to allow the medium to thrust her legs through as far as the hips, when the dress had been drawn up, and spread over the seat of the chair. The medium would, therefore, be in a kneeling position behind the chair, with the upper part of her body in front of the chair-back, and, of course, visible to the investigators who made the examination."

Charles Richet has written that all the wonders attributed to Madame D’Esperance must be "eliminated, for with them there was evident fraud."

Publications

Shadow Land, or, Light from the Other Side (1897)
Northern Lights, and Other Psychic Stories (1899)

References

Further reading 

Alexandr Aksakov. (1898). A Case of Partial Dematerialization of the Body of a Medium. Boston: Banner of Light Publishing Company.
Hereward Carrington. (1907). The Physical Phenomena of Spiritualism. Herbert B. Turner & Co.
Hereward Carrington. (1907). An Examination and Analysis of the Evidence for “Dematerialization” as Demonstrated in Mons. Aksakof’s Book. Proceedings of the American Society for Psychical Research. Volume 1: 131–168.
Alex Owen. (2004). The Darkened Room: Women, Power, and Spiritualism in Late Victorian England. University Of Chicago Press. 

1855 births
1919 deaths
English fraudsters
English spiritual mediums
19th-century English businesspeople